Bank on the Stars is an American game show that aired on CBS and NBC from 1953 to 1954. The series was hosted by Jack Paar, Bill Cullen, and Jimmy Nelson. Olin Tice and Bill McCord were the announcers.

Broadcast history

CBS (1953)
Bank on the Stars premiered on June 20, 1953. The Saturday night game show was hosted by Jack Paar. The debut episode aired at 9:00 PM ET; subsequent airings were shown at 9:30 PM ET. Its run on CBS ended on August 8, 1953.

NBC (1954)
The series returned May 15, 1954, on NBC. It occupied the 8:00 PM ET time slot on Saturday nights. Bill Cullen was the host for the first several weeks until Jimmy Nelson took over in July. The final episode aired on August 21, 1954.

Gameplay
Bank on the Stars was a memory game in which contestants, competing in two-person teams, viewed scenes from recently released feature films and were quizzed on what they had just seen. Each correct response earns the team $50, and the team with the most money at the end of the game advanced to the bonus round. There, the contestants were asked more difficult questions about a different movie but they could only hear, not see, the film clip.

References

External links
 

1953 American television series debuts
1954 American television series endings
1950s American comedy game shows
CBS original programming
Black-and-white American television shows
English-language television shows
NBC original programming
Television shows set in New York City